Axel Schimpf (born 1 October 1952) is a retired Vizeadmiral (vice admiral) of the German Navy.

Biography
Schimpf served as Inspector of the Navy from April 2010 to October 2014. He previously served as an officer on German fast attack craft, and as chief of the Navy Office from 2008 to 2010. He retired from military service on 28 October 2014, when he was replaced as Inspector by Andreas Krause.

References 

Vice admirals of the German Navy
1952 births
Living people
Recipients of the Cross of the Order of Merit of the Federal Republic of Germany
Commanders of the Ordre national du Mérite
Recipients of the Badge of Honour of the Bundeswehr
Chiefs of Navy (Germany)
People from Speyer
Military personnel from Rhineland-Palatinate